Denislav Angelov (born 8 June 2001) is a Bulgarian footballer who plays as a forward for Dobrudzha.

Career
Angelov made his professional debut for Cherno More Varna on 23 August 2019 in a league match against Arda Kardzhali. He signed his first professional contract with Charno More on 14 January 2020.

Career statistics

Club

References

External links
 

Living people
2001 births
Bulgarian footballers
First Professional Football League (Bulgaria) players
PFC Cherno More Varna players
FC CSKA 1948 Sofia players
Association football forwards